The Birdland Big Band is a 16-piece jazz orchestra that performs at the Birdland Jazz Club in New York City. The Birdland Big Band is led by saxophonist David DeJesus

DeJesus joined as saxophonist and leader in October 2017 and brought with him an emphasis on traditional swing and the blues. He hired drummer Chris Smith, bassist Doug Weiss, trumpeter Brandon Lee, and added a fourth trombonist in Ron Wilkins. These musicians joined Glenn Drewes, Tony Lustig, John Walsh, Mark Miller, Kenny Ascher, and Nathan Childers. In 2017 vocalist Veronica Swift was added.

History
The band was created in 2006 by drummer Tommy Igoe, son of jazz drummer Sonny Igoe.
Tommy Igoe founded The Friday Night Big Band with musicians from a big band that was in residence at Birdland. That band was founded and directed by Lew Anderson, who died in 2006. After Igoe took over, he changed the name to Birdland Big Band and built a repertoire of contemporary compositions, original arrangements, and select historical works, some forgotten or rare. Guest musicians included Will Lee, James Genus, Conrad Korsch, and Broadway pit musicians who use the early evening sessions as a warm-up for their performances later that night. After Igoe left the band, it was directed for several years by Rob Middleton and Glenn Drewes.

Members
 David DeJesus - Leader/Tenor 
 Nathan Childers - Alto
 Alejandro Aviles - Alto
 Mike Migliori - Tenor
 Tony Lustig - Bari
 Glenn Drewes - Trumpet
 John Walsh - Trumpet
 Raul Agraz - Trumpet
 Brandon Lee - Trumpet
 Mark Miller - Trombone
 Sara Jacovino - Trombone
 Ron Wilkins - Trombone 
 James Borowski - Bass Trombone
 Chris Smith - Drums 
 Kenny Ascher - Piano
 Doug Weiss - Bass

Discography
 The Lew Anderson Tribute Concert (2007)
 Eleven (2012)

References 

American jazz ensembles from New York City
Hard bop ensembles
Musical groups established in 2006
Swing music
Musical groups from New York City
Big bands
Jazz musicians from New York (state)